Carlos Mapili Padilla is a Filipino politician from Dupax del Norte, Nueva Vizcaya, Philippines currently serving as the Governor of Nueva Vizcaya. Padilla was elected to his first term as Governor in 2016 and was re-elected in 2019.

Early life and education
Carlos Mapili Padilla was born September 19, 1944. His mother, Victoriana Mapili of Aringay, La Union, and Tayug, Pangasinan, was a simple hard-working woman who raised the three Padilla children on her own despite her lack of education. Carlos was an illegitimate son. Hence, he had to paddle his own canoe to study and earn a living. His father died when Carlos was 13.

Political career

House of Representatives 
Prior to his successful career as a veteran lawmaker, he served as a Local Chief Executive of the then undivided municipality of Dupax, Nueva Vizcaya. He was the last Mayor of an undivided Dupax and the first mayor of Dupax Del Norte after Dupax was split into three namely, Dupax del Norte, Dupax del Sur and Alfonso Castañeda.

While in Congress, he served as Deputy Speaker and a Minority Leader. He became a member of very important congressional bodies such as the Commission on Appointments and the House of Representative Electoral Tribunal (HRET). He became the Co-chairperson of the congressional commission called the EDCom with Senator Edgardo Angara as Chairperson, a body to assess Philippine education.

On several occasions, he represented Congress in several international conferences abroad, such as the International Labor Organization Conference in Geneva, the Asia-Pacific Parliamentarians’ Union, the ASEAN Inter-Parliamentary Organization Conference, and the UNESCO General Assembly in Paris among others.

2004 Elections 
In 2004, he ran for senator under the ticket of Sen. Panfilo Lacson and lost. He ended up at the 24th spot garnering 3,863,693 votes which represents 11.53% votes.

Governor of Nueva Vizcaya 
He ran for governor in 2016 and won, receiving 91,105 votes. He ran again for a second term in 2019 winning in a bigger margin of 17.05% than 2016's 15.2%

He filed his certificate of candidacy (COC) for re-election in the coming May 2022 national and local elections. This may be his last time running for public office.

He secured his last term after winning in the May 9 local elections. He garnered 143,552 votes, following a 100% transmission of election returns.

His only rival, incumbent Vice Governor Jose “Tam-An” Tomas Sr., got 97,774 votes.

PRAYERS N' FAITH 
A 13-point agenda known by its acronym, "PRAYERS N FAITH". It is actually a platform of government started four years ago by the then Governor Ruth Raña-Padilla. And it is being vigorously pursued by the current Governor of Nueva Vizcaya.

PRAYERS N FAITH stads for:
P - rotecting the Environment
R - estructuring the provincial bureaucracy
A -gricultural Development and food security
Y - outh and Sports Development
E - ducation and Skills training
R - ural Development including energization of rural areas
S - ocial Services for the elderly, PWD's, women and the marginalized sectors

N - et working and establishing Linkages with partners

F - arm to Market roads and infra development
A - rts and Culture
I - ndigenous people's
T -ourism that is sustainable and mindful of ecological concerns
H - ealth Services for our people

Legislations
While Education Committee chairman, he authored the landmark law Free High School Act of 1988 (RA 6655) that ensures free high school education for every Filipino. 
He followed this with RA 6728, providing various forms of government assistance to students and teachers in private education. Padilla has also authored the following measures: 
RA 6966 regulating the librarian profession, RA 7104 creating the Commission on the Filipino Language, RA 7168 converting the Philippine Normal College into the Philippine Normal University, RA 7536 creating the National Commission for Culture and the Arts, the Philippine Nursing Act (RA 9173), and the proposed Philippine Dentistry Act (HB 4908), among other important measures on education.

He also authored HB No. 24758, now RA 6728, "An Act Providing Government Assistance to Students And Teachers in Private Education," better known as the subsidy bill. The measure is in conformity with the mandate of the Constitution in promoting and making quality education for all Filipino people.

His partiality for education is also seen in Nueva Vizcaya, which he has turned into a veritable center of learning in the Cagayan Valley region.  So far, he has, he said, "established more than 40 high schools all over the province, which has 15 towns. That means an average of two schools per town."

Padilla is the principal author and sponsor of dozens of laws establishing schools like the Nueva Vizcaya State University and the Philippine Science High School Cagayan Valley campus, located in Bayombong, which gathers the best and the brightest from the region.

Awards
Padilla was a recipient of the outstanding alumnus award at the Polytechnic University of the Philippines (PUP), where he served as President of the Supreme Student Council and also received his doctorate degree in Public Administration, honoris causa. He likewise received the same honorary degree in Education, and in Humanities, from Philippine Normal University and Nueva Vizcaya State Institute of Technology and the Nueva Vizcaya State Polytechnic College, now the Nueva Vizcaya State University (NVSU) respectively.

Personal life
Governor Carlos M. Padilla is married to Ruth Raña Padilla, who also served as provincial governor of Nueva Vizcaya and PRC Commissioner and they have three children: Carlos “Jojo” II, Ruthie Maye, and Carlo Paolo who are his number one supporters and the source of his strength to fulfill his oath to the people of Nueva Vizcaya.

References

Living people
Governors of Nueva Vizcaya
1944 births
Nacionalista Party politicians
Polytechnic University of the Philippines alumni